Caprichromis is a small genus of haplochromine cichlids endemic to Lake Malawi in East Africa. This genus contains noted paedophagous cichlids, specialising in the eating of eggs and fry of other cichlid species.

Species
There are currently two recognized species in this genus:
 Caprichromis liemi (McKaye & Mackenzie, 1982) (Happy)
 Caprichromis orthognathus (Trewavas, 1935)

References

 
Haplochromini

Cichlid genera
Taxa named by Ethelwynn Trewavas